A life list, or life-list, is a list of all biological species seen by a person. The phrase is particularly common among bird watchers, some of whom compete with each other to have the most complete list.

References

Birdwatching